Edward Maurice was an Anglican bishop in Ireland, Bishop of Ossory from 1755 to 1756 
He was educated at Trinity College, Dublin, after which he was Rector of Armagh.
He died on 11 February 1756.

Notes

1756 deaths
Alumni of Trinity College, Cambridge
18th-century Anglican bishops in Ireland
Anglican bishops of Ossory